The Saint Pablo Tour was a concert tour by American rapper Kanye West which ran from August 25, 2016 to November 19, 2016 in support of West's seventh solo studio album, The Life of Pablo (2016). The tour was originally planned to run until December 31, 2016, but was canceled prematurely on November 21, 2016 due to West's hospitalization. It was the 18th highest-grossing tour of 2016 in North America. The shows played at The Forum in Inglewood, California were the most lucrative.

History

Design

The design of Saint Pablo Tour featured a "first-of-its-kind floating stage" which was composed of a main stage and an auxiliary stage that had an intricate system of pulleys and tracks designed to be connected to the frame of each arena. The floating main stage had lights on the edge as well as on the bottom portion, which would occasionally shine on the audience. The second stage was composed of four rectangular portions which would move and provided ambient light for each song. The stages could then be manipulated to the needs of the tour, incorporating the audience into the experience at each concert as visitors would be able to engage with Kanye West. Each show had three sections separated by two intermissions, with uses of light increasing as the performance progresses. Some of the portions appeared to be influenced by various themes in popular culture, such as the show's intermissions which were similar to Close Encounters of the Third Kind by Steven Spielberg.

Tour
West began the Saint Pablo Tour in Indianapolis, Indiana on August 25, 2016, introducing his new stage design to the public, impressing the attending audience. On October 2, 2016, West cut his performance short at Citi Field in New York City following news of his wife Kim Kardashian being robbed at gunpoint in Paris. Two tour dates were also cancelled the following week.

Kanye's returning concert following Kim Kardashian's incident was performed in his hometown of Chicago at the United Center on October 7, 2016, where he arrived on stage an hour and a half past schedule and "made no mention of his wife or the incident, in a show in which he barely spoke to the crowd at all". In San Jose, California during his November 17 performance, West spoke about American politics and stated "If I would have voted, I would have voted for Trump", with some fans booing and throwing items on stage.  In Sacramento on November 19, 2016, West performed three songs before he diverted the performance and spoke about Facebook, Jay Z, Hillary Clinton, Beyoncé, and then proceeded to walk off stage, later cancelling further dates of the tour due to stress and exhaustion while ticketholders were given a refund.

Set list 

 ''Father Stretch My Hands Pt. 1"
 "Pt. 2"
 "Famous"
 "Pop Style"
 "That Part"
 "Facts"
 "Mercy"
 "Don't Like.1"
 "All Day"
 "Black Skinhead"
 "Niggas in Paris"
 "Can't Tell Me Nothing"
 "Power"
 "Blood on the Leaves"
 "Freestyle 4"
 "Jesus Walks"
 "Flashing Lights"
 "Highlights"
 "Feedback"
 "Wolves"
 "Heartless"
 "Runaway"
 "Only One"
 "I Love Kanye"
 "Waves"
 "All of the Lights"
 "Good Life"
 "Stronger"
 "Touch the Sky"
 "Fade"
 "Ultralight Beam"

Tour dates

Dates performed

Cancelled dates

Reception

The architectural website ArchDaily stated:

Notes

References

Kanye West concert tours
2016 concert tours
Concert tours of the United States
Concert tours of Canada